The Big Quilcene Estuary lies on the Quilcene bay on the coast of Jefferson County, Washington in north-west Washington state on the Olympic Peninsula.

Protected area
The Hood Canal Salmon Enhancement Group partnered with the JCCD, Jefferson Co., local property owners and the Washington Department of Fish and Wildlife to restore manage the Big Quilcene Estuary.  The project permanently protects and restored the mouth of the Big Quilcene River, removing 5,000 feet of levee to restore 40 acres of salt marsh with 3,000 feet of tidal channels in the Quilcene Bay.

Species
Primary Species Benefiting
 Chum salmon
Secondary Species Benefiting
Bull trout
Chinook salmon
Coho salmon
Coastal cutthroat trout
River lamprey
 Steelhead
 Other Wildlife

See also
Hood Canal
Quilcene, Washington
Big Quilcene River
Donovan Creek Estuary
Little Quilcene Estuary
Little Quilcene River
Olympic Peninsula

References

External links
Jefferson Land Trust

Nature reserves in Washington (state)
Bays of Washington (state)
Estuaries of Washington (state)
Protected areas of Jefferson County, Washington
Bodies of water of Jefferson County, Washington
Bays of Jefferson County, Washington